The statue of George Vancouver is an outdoor sculpture  by Italian-born artist Charles Marega, installed outside the Vancouver City Hall in Vancouver, British Columbia. It was unveiled in 1936 by Sir Percy Vincent.

History
The statue was vandalized in 2020.

References

External links

 

Monuments and memorials in Vancouver
Outdoor sculptures in Vancouver
Sculptures of men in Canada
Statues in Canada
Vandalized works of art in Canada